Peter Guinness is a British television writer.  His credits include The Relief of Belsen (2007).

See also
Television in the United Kingdom

References

External links

British television writers
Living people
Year of birth missing (living people)
Place of birth missing (living people)
21st-century British people